Tympanotonos fuscatus, the West African mud creeper, is a species of snail living in brackish water, a gastropod mollusk in the family Potamididae.

Tympanotonos fuscatus is the only extant species in the genus Tympanotonos.

Description

Distribution
This species is found along the west coast of Africa, from Angola in the south to Senegal in the north, and also Cape Verde.

References

Potamididae
Molluscs of the Atlantic Ocean
Molluscs of Angola
Gastropods of Cape Verde
Invertebrates of Gabon
Gastropods described in 1758
Taxa named by Carl Linnaeus
Endemic fauna of Angola
Endemic fauna of Cape Verde
Endemic fauna of Gabon